Sirius XM Holdings Inc. is an American broadcasting company headquartered in Midtown Manhattan, New York City that provides satellite radio and online radio services operating in the United States. It was formed by the 2008 merger of Sirius Satellite Radio and XM Satellite Radio, merging them into SiriusXM Radio. The company also has a 70% equity interest in Sirius XM Canada, an affiliate company that provides Sirius and XM service in Canada. On May 21, 2013, Sirius XM Holdings, Inc. was incorporated, and in January 2020, Sirius XM reorganized their corporate structure, which made Sirius XM Radio Inc. a direct, wholly owned subsidiary of Sirius XM Holdings, Inc.

The U.S. Federal Communications Commission (FCC) approved the merger of XM Satellite Radio and Sirius Satellite Radio, Inc. on July 29, 2008, 17 months after the companies first proposed it. The merger created a company with 18.5 million subscribers, and the deal was valued at US$3.3 billion, not including debt. The proposed merger was opposed by those who felt it would create a monopoly. Sirius and XM argued that a merger was the only way that satellite radio could survive.

In September 2018, the company agreed to purchase the streaming music service Pandora, and this transaction was completed on February 1, 2019. Since then, SiriusXM has grown to be the largest audio entertainment company in North America.

, Sirius XM had approximately 34 million subscribers.

Sirius XM Radio is a primary entry point for the Emergency Alert System.

Pre-merger

Early days of Sirius 

Sirius Satellite Radio was founded by Martine Rothblatt, who served as the new company's chairman of the board. Co-founder David Margolese served as chief executive officer and Robert Briskman served as president and Chief Operating Officer. In 1990, Rothblatt founded Satellite CD Radio in Washington, D.C. The company was the first to petition the FCC to assign unused frequencies for satellite radio broadcast, which "provoked a furor among owners of both large and small [terrestrial] radio stations". In April 1992, Rothblatt resigned as chairman and CEO to start a medical research foundation. Former NASA engineer Briskman, who designed the company's satellite technology, was then appointed chairman and CEO. Six months later, in November 1992, Rogers Wireless co-founder Margolese, who had provided financial backing for the venture, acquired control of the company and succeeded Briskman. Margolese renamed the company CD Radio, and spent the next five years lobbying the FCC to allow satellite radio to be deployed, and the following five years raising US$1.6 billion, which was used to build and launch three satellites into elliptical orbit from Kazakhstan in July 2000. In 1997, after Margolese had obtained regulatory clearance and "effectively created the industry", the FCC also awarded a license to XM Satellite Radio, which followed Sirius' example. In November 1999, marketing chief Ira Bahr convinced Margolese to again change the name of the company, this time to Sirius Satellite Radio, in order to avoid association with the soon-to-be-outdated CD technology. Having secured installation deals with automakers, including BMW, Chrysler and Ford, Sirius launched the initial phase of its service in four cities on February 14, 2002, expanding to the rest of the contiguous United States on July 1, 2002.

In November 2001, Margolese stepped down as CEO, remaining as chairman until November 2003, with Sirius issuing a statement thanking him "for his great vision, leadership and dedication in creating both Sirius and the satellite radio industry". Joe Clayton, former CEO of Global Crossing, followed as CEO from November 2001 until November 2004; stayed on as chairman until July 2008. Mel Karmazin, former president of Viacom, became CEO in November 2004 and remained in that position through the merger, until December 2012.

Early days of XM 

The origin of XM Satellite Radio was a Petition for Rulemaking filed at the Federal Communications Commission (FCC) by regulatory attorney and Founder of Satellite CD Radio Martine Rothblatt, to establish frequencies and licensing rules for the world's first-ever Satellite Digital Audio Radio Service (SDARS). On May 18, 1990, Satellite CD Radio, Inc. (SCDR) filed a Petition for Rule Making in which it requested spectrum to offer Compact Disc quality digital audio radio service to be delivered by satellites and complementary radio transmitters. Following the Allocation NPRM, the FCC established a December 15, 1992, cut-off date for applications proposing satellite DARS to be considered in conjunction with CD Radio's application. One such application came from American Mobile Radio Corporation (AMRC), the predecessor company to XM Satellite Radio. XM Satellite Radio was founded by Lon Levin and Gary Parsons. It has its origins in the 1988 formation of the American Mobile Satellite Corporation (AMSC), a consortium of several organizations originally dedicated to satellite broadcasting of telephone, fax, and data signals. In 1992, AMSC established a unit called the American Mobile Radio Corporation, dedicated to developing a satellite-based digital radio service; this was spun off as XM Satellite Radio Holdings, Inc. in 1998. Its planned financing was complete by July 2000, at which point XM had raised US$1.26 billion and secured installation agreements with General Motors, Honda, and Toyota. Initially scheduled for September 12, 2001, XM's service start date was postponed due to the September 11, 2001, terrorist attacks on the World Trade Center and The Pentagon. XM Satellite Radio's first broadcast was on September 25, 2001, nearly four months before Sirius.

Gary Parsons served as chairman of XM Satellite Radio from its inception through the merger, and resigned from the position in November 2009. Hugh Panero served as XM's CEO from 1998 until July 2007, shortly after the merger with Sirius was proposed. Nate Davis was appointed interim CEO until the merger was completed, at which point Sirius CEO Mel Karmazin took over as CEO of the newly merged company, Sirius XM.

Merger

Announcement 
After years of speculation (the New York Post first reported on a potential merger in January 2005)  and three months of serious negotiations, the US$13 billion merger between Sirius and XM was officially announced on February 19, 2007. At the time, the nation's only two satellite radio providers reported nearly 14 million combined subscribers (with nearly 8 million belonging to XM), with neither having turned an annual profit. Sirius was valued at US$5.2 billion, and XM at US$3.75 billion. Each subscription was sold for US$12.95 monthly.

XM and Sirius executives felt the merger would lower programming costs by eliminating overlapping stations and duplicated marketing costs. According to their original operating licenses, the two companies were not allowed to ever own each other's license. In proceeding with the merger, Sirius CEO Mel Karmazin ignored this rule, gambling that the FCC would consider other audio entertainment to be competitors and allow the merger to proceed by waiving the rule.

Approval 
After a 57-week review process, the U.S. Justice Department approved the Sirius and XM merger on March 24, 2008, concluding that satellite radio competes with terrestrial radio, online streaming, and mp3 players and tablets. On July 25, 2008, the FCC approved the merger with a 3–2 vote, determining that it was not a monopoly because of competition on the Internet. FCC chairman Kevin Martin stated, "The merger is in the public interest and will provide consumers with greater flexibility and choices".

The biggest challenge for the newly unified company was selling more subscriptions with the drop in the number of cars sold annually in the U.S., the subsequent reduced demand for cars equipped with satellite radio, as well as online radio-streaming competition. Conditions of the merger included allowing any third-party company to make satellite radio devices; producing new radios that can receive both XM and Sirius channels within one year; allowing consumers to choose which channels they would like to have; freezing subscription rates for three years; setting aside 8% of its channels for noncommercial programmers; and paying US$19.7 million in fines for past rule violations. Sirius and XM began merging their channels on November 12, 2008.

Each share of XM stock was replaced with 4.6 shares of Sirius stock. Each company's stockholders initially retained approximately 50% of the joined company. At the time of the merger, Sirius' top programming included channels for Howard Stern, and Martha Stewart; live NBA and NFL games; and live NASCAR races. XM's programming included channels for Willie Nelson, Opie and Anthony, Snoop Dogg, and Oprah Winfrey; and live Major League Baseball games.

Opposition 
The National Association of Broadcasters was adamantly opposed to the merger, calling it a monopoly. Shortly after the Justice Department gave its support to the merger without restrictions, attorneys general from 11 states (Connecticut, Iowa, Maryland, Mississippi, Missouri, Nevada, Ohio, Oklahoma, Rhode Island, Utah, and Washington) urged the FCC to impose restrictions on the merger. Several Congressional Democrats also opposed the merger, calling it anticompetitive and criticizing the Bush administration for allowing it to go through.

Post-merger

Resurgence and growth 
After coming close to filing for Chapter 11 only months after the 2008 merger, having gone so far as to hire lawyers to prepare a possible bankruptcy filing, Sirius XM was able to avoid declaring bankruptcy with the assistance of a US$530 million loan from Liberty Media in February 2009, which Mel Karmazin negotiated in exchange for a 40% equity stake in Sirius XM.

In the fourth quarter of 2009, Sirius XM posted a profit for the first time, with a net income of US$14.2 million. This came after net losses of US$245.8 million in the year following the merger. The company's resurgence was owed in part to the loan from Liberty Media. Increased automobile sales in the U.S. were also a factor. Sirius XM ended 2009 with 18.8 million subscribers. By the end of 2012, Sirius XM's subscriber base had grown to 23.9 million, mostly due to an increase in partnerships with automakers and car dealers; a strong push in the used-car market; and continued improved car sales in the U.S. in general. The renewal of radio show host Howard Stern's contract through 2015 (US$400 million for five years, US$100 million less than Stern's previous five-year deal) was also a factor in the company's steady growth; Stern's show attracted over 12 million listeners per week.

As of 2017, Sirius XM had approximately a 75% penetration rate in the new car market. Out of that 75%, approximately 40% become subscribers. SiriusXM is available in cars from every major car company as well as in assorted trucks, boats and aircraft. The company offers trial subscriptions to new car owners, and then offers customers a variety of subscription options. There are more than 100 million cars on the road with SiriusXM radios installed.

After trying for four years, on December 21, 2010, Sirius XM received approval from the FCC to add service in Alaska and Hawaii. Sirius XM announced on January 17, 2011, that it would place repeaters in those states and adjust three of its satellites to cover those areas. The move gave Sirius XM coverage in all 50 states.

On January 12, 2011, XM Satellite Radio, Inc. was dissolved as a separate entity and merged into Sirius XM Radio, Inc. On April 11, 2011, the Canadian Radio-television and Telecommunications Commission (CRTC) approved the merger of Sirius and XM's Canadian affiliates in Sirius XM Canada.

On April 11, 2013, a New York appeals court upheld a New York judge's ruling, from April 2012, that Howard Stern was not entitled to stock bonuses based on Sirius XM's exceeding subscriber target projections. The court ruled that subscribers to XM Satellite Radio from before the Sirius XM merger should not be counted as "Sirius subscribers" for the purposes of Stern's lawsuit. Stern argued the opposite, because his popularity had played an integral role in helping Sirius acquire XM. He had been seeking US$330 million in stock bonuses.

In 2017, SiriusXM surpassed 32 million subscribers.

On September 24, 2018, Sirius XM announced its intent to acquire Pandora for US$3.5 billion. The acquisition was completed on February 1, 2019. On October 19, 2020, SiriusXM announced that it completed the acquisition of Stitcher. It later purchased Conan O'Brien's digital media assets, including his podcast Conan O'Brien Needs a Friend, for $150 million.

In March 2023, SiriusXM announced it would cut 475 employees that amounts to 8% of its workforce. CEO Jennifer Witz cited economic uncertainty and a need to operate with "greater agility and efficiency."

Executives 
Following the merger, Sirius CEO Mel Karmazin became CEO of the combined company, and XM chairman Gary Parsons retained his role. XM CEO and co-founder Hugh Panero stepped down in August 2007, shortly after the merger was first announced.

XM Satellite Radio executives who were not offered jobs in the new combined company were assured golden parachute severance packages that had been approved in 2007. Former CEO Nate Davis received a severance package worth US$10 million. Erik Toppenberg, executive vice president of programming, received a severance package worth US$5.34 million. CFO Joseph Euteneuer received a severance package worth US$4.9 million. Vernon Irvin, chief marketing officer, received a severance package worth US$4.5 million.

In November 2009, Parsons resigned as chairman of Sirius XM, receiving a payout of more than US$9 million. He was succeeded by Eddy Hartenstein, former publisher and CEO of the Los Angeles Times. In December 2012, Mel Karmazin stepped down as Sirius XM CEO after Liberty Media gained control of 49.5% of the company. James E. Meyer was named interim CEO. On April 30, 2013, he was named permanent CEO. Also in April 2013, Liberty Media CEO Greg Maffei was named Sirius XM's chairman, succeeding Hartenstein.

In October 2019, Denise Karkos was named Chief Marketing Officer and in November 2019, Alex Luke was named Senior VP of Digital Content for SiriusXM and Pandora.

In September 2020, SiriusXM announced that Jennifer Witz will succeed James Meyer as the company's Chief Executive Officer once he retires by December 31, 2020. The company also hired AMC Networks Inc's Sean Sullivan as Chief Financial Officer.

In December 2021, Joe Inzerillo, former CTO of Disney Streaming Services, was named the Chief Technology Officer of SiriusXM.

Internet and mobile 
Sirius XM radio content is available to stream online either as an add-on to existing subscriptions or as an Internet-only option. 

In August 2011, SiriusXM announced that the company would start offering a personalized interactive online radio experience. MySXM debuted on April 15, 2013, allowing users to fine-tune over 50 existing Sirius XM channels. MySXM is available to all Sirius XM subscribers.

The internet player allows subscribers to customize most stations to their liking by adjusting settings like: familiar/hits or unfamiliar/depth, studio recordings or live performances, and new/recent or old/classic material. These customized stations also allow listeners to play music without DJ interruptions. SiriusXM apps also include an extensive lineup of archived programming on SiriusXM On Demand.

On June 17, 2009, Sirius XM released an application for use on Apple's iPhone and iPod Touch, allowing its subscribers to listen to its programming on those devices. The application did not feature all of the programming available to satellite listeners. On March 17, 2011, the application was also made available for the iPad. In 2012, the application was updated for iOS and Android, featuring additional content, and the ability to pause, rewind, and fast-forward through audio streams.

On February 4, 2010, the Sirius XM BlackBerry application was announced, for use on BlackBerry smartphones (the Bold, Curve, Storm, and Tour). As of April 2013, the app featured over 150 channels.

On May 28, 2010, the Sirius XM application for Android smartphones was announced. As of April 2013, the app features over 130 channels.

As part of Howard Stern's new five-year contract with SiriusXM, which he signed on December 9, 2010, The Howard Stern Show, which hadn't previously been made available on mobile devices, would now be a part of Sirius XM's mobile app package.

On March 18, 2015, SiriusXM released a refreshed user interface of the application on Android and iOS.

As of October 2017, SiriusXM is available for streaming via custom apps on a variety of connected devices including Amazon Alexa  and Fire TV, Sonos, PlayStation, Roku, and smart TVs.

In May 2018, SiriusXM unveiled a new look for both the desktop web player and the mobile apps. The MySXM feature, including all the custom mixes that listeners saved over time, was removed. SiriusXM claims that they're working on a more personalized feature that will release in the upcoming months. SiriusXM later expanded their internet and mobile platforms by acquiring Pandora in February 2019.

In early November 2019, SiriusXM became available to stream on all devices that use Google Assistant.

In June 2022, SiriusXM streaming was added to Xfinity customers using the cable provider's X1, Xfinity Flex, and XClass TV platforms.

Subscriptions 
Following the merger, Sirius XM began offering numerous new options, including à la carte offerings, a family-friendly version, and "mostly music" or "news, sports, and talk" packages, ranging in price from US$6.99 to US$16.99 per month.

Prior to the merger, Sirius offered, for a one-time fee, a lifetime subscription for the radio unit (not the customer's lifetime). After the merger, due to changes in bundling policies and contracts, some customers who had purchased lifetime subscriptions had their service reduced or canceled, and were unable to obtain a refund.

In 2021, a settlement was reached in "Alvarez v. Sirius XM Radio Inc." regarding customers with these Sirius lifetime subscriptions.  All lifetime subscriptions are now for the lifetime of the owner, not the radio unit. Subscriptions can be transferred from one radio to another for $35. Inactive lifetime subscriptions can be cancelled and owners paid $100

Legal settlement 
On December 4, 2014, Sirius XM Holdings agreed to a US$3.8 million settlement with 45 states and the District of Columbia, over a suit initiated by then-Ohio Attorney General Mike DeWine, stemming from the company's billing and service renewal practices. The suit alleged Sirius XM Holdings was engaged in "misleading, unfair and deceptive acts or practices in violation of state consumer protection laws", Attorney General DeWine said.

Programming 

SiriusXM is the exclusive home to Howard Stern, with two dedicated Howard Stern channels. SiriusXM's talk, news, and comedy programming features channels from many news outlets, including: BBC, CNBC, FOX News, CNN, MSNBC, Bloomberg, NPR, and C-SPAN. The programming also includes exclusive talk and entertainment channels such as TODAY Show Radio, Business Radio Powered By The Wharton School, Entertainment Weekly Radio, Faction Talk, Radio Andy, Joel Osteen Radio, and comedy from channels including Comedy Central Radio, Comedy Greats, Laugh USA, Raw Dog Comedy and George Carlin's Carlin's Corner.

SiriusXM music programming includes channels dedicated to multiple decades and genres that span rock, pop, country, R&B, hip-hop, electronic dance, jazz and more, and concept-based channels, such as The Coffee House, SiriusXM Chill, Road Trip Radio, and Yacht Rock Radio.

The service also features several artist-branded channels, including those for Pitbull, The Beatles, Bob Marley, Bruce Springsteen, Steven Van Zandt, Pearl Jam, Grateful Dead, Jimmy Buffett, Phish, Dave Matthews Band, Tom Petty, U2, Ozzy Osbourne, LL Cool J, Eminem, Diplo, Kenny Chesney, Willie Nelson, Kirk Franklin, Frank Sinatra, B.B. King, Red Hot Chili Peppers, Dwight Yoakam, Marky Ramone, Steve Aoki, The Tragically Hip, Chucho Valdés, and Tom Morello. On occasion, SiriusXM has offered limited edition artists channels for a specific period of time, including those for Drake, Metallica, David Bowie, Fleetwood Mac, Prince, Guns N' Roses, Led Zeppelin, George Strait, The Rolling Stones, Eagles, Queen, Beastie Boys, Coldplay, Michael Jackson, Foo Fighters, Aretha Franklin, Miles Davis, Jimi Hendrix, Billy Joel, ABBA, Alicia Keys, Neil Young, and Blue Rodeo.

SiriusXM offers live play-by-play coverage of every NFL, Major League Baseball, and NBA game; every NASCAR race; PGA Tour events; and live college sports, as well as news, analysis and opinions from more than a dozen dedicated sports talk channels.

SiriusXM also offers "Listen Free" events twice a year during late May-early June and late November-early December.

Canadian counterparts 

In Canada, Sirius Canada and XM Canada were partially owned by Sirius XM (20% and 23.3% respectively) in joint ventures with Canadian companies. After the U.S. merger, the two Canadian ventures did not immediately agree to a similar merger, but instead remained in competition as distinct services. Complicating matters was that Sirius Canada has nearly 80% of the total satellite radio subscriber base in that country, and felt they deserved greater than a 50/50 split of the new company, whereas XM Canada felt their deal with the NHL – a particularly lucrative prize in Canadian sports broadcasting – also warranted a significant amount of value in the new company.

On November 24, 2010, XM Radio Canada and Sirius Canada announced that they would merge their services. On April 12, 2011, the CRTC approved the companies' merger into Sirius XM Canada. John Bitove's Canadian Satellite Radio Holdings Inc., the licensee of XM Canada, gained a 30% share in the new company as its primary and controlling shareholder, while Slaight Communications and the Canadian Broadcasting Corporation, the current owners of Sirius Canada, each retained 20% ownership. Sirius XM's American parent company would hold 25%. The merger was completed on June 21, 2011. Sirius XM Holdings now owns a 70% equity interest and a 33% voting interest in Sirius XM Canada, as of 2020.

Technical

Receivers 
XM and Sirius use different compression and conditional access systems, making their receivers incompatible with each other's service. A condition of the merger was that Sirius XM would bring to the market satellite radios that can receive both XM and Sirius channels within one year. The interoperable radio, called the MiRGE, was made available beginning in March 2009 but was soon discontinued after both services eliminated duplicate channels, thus removing the need for it. , Sirius XM offers radios for home, office, automotive, marine, and aviation use.

SiriusXM Marine is graphic weather and fishing info for boaters. The service works with most major marine-electronics hardware companies, such as Raymarine, Furuno, Simrad and Garmin. The Marine Offshore package includes graphic weather radar, cloud-to-cloud and cloud-to-ground lightning, high-resolution coastal and offshore wave heights, direction and intervals, high-resolution sea-surface temperatures, pressure isobars, buoy data, etc.

SiriusXM Aviation provides satellite-based graphic weather information for pilots, which provides better signal coverage and faster data refresh rate than land-based ADS-B service. The 2020 FAA Mandate does not require pilots to equip with ADS‑B/FIS‑B weather.

SiriusXM Aviation receiver Model # SXAR1 and Garmin GDL51/GDL52 enables pilots to use an iPad or iPhone with the ForeFlight Mobile App, via Bluetooth, to view the SiriusXM Aviation in-flight weather and data delivered via satellite to monitor storm fronts, track lightning strikes, TAFs, METARs, winds and more.

Satellites 
, there are six functional satellites in orbit: two XM, two Sirius, and two supporting both systems (one being a spare). XM-3 and XM-4 are the active satellites for the XM service and replaced the original XM-1 and XM-2 satellites (which were placed into disposal orbits). Sirius FM-5 and FM-6 function as the primaries for the Sirius side. FM-6 was launched on October 25, 2013, and was declared ready for service on December 2, 2013. The satellite initially served as an in-orbit spare while the company worked to deploy repeaters for the Sirius side, which were needed to transition to full geostationary orbit operation. In 2016, FM-6 was put into active service and officially replaced Sirius originals FM-1 through FM-3 which operated in elliptical orbit. FM-1 through FM-3 were later placed into disposal orbits. With this change, FM-5 and FM-6 exclusively serve the Sirius service, mirroring XM-3 and XM-4. Before FM-6 was launched, XM-5 was sent into orbit by Proton from Kazakhstan, on October 14, 2010. It is capable of broadcasting to either service. XM-5 serves as the in-orbit spare for the entire system and can function in place of either a Sirius or XM satellite. In late 2016, SiriusXM placed an order for two new satellites SXM-7 and SXM-8 which were intended to replace XM-3 and XM-4 and have the capability to deliver either Sirius or XM content to radio receivers. SXM-7 was launched December 13, 2020, via a SpaceX Falcon 9 (failed after being successfully placed into orbit), while SXM-8 was launched on June 6, 2021 (delayed due to failure of SXM-7).

Sirius satellites broadcast within the S-band frequencies from 2.3200 to 2.3325 GHz, while XM radio uses adjacent frequencies 2.3325–2.3450 GHz.

Functional satellites 
 Sirius FM-5 (Radiosat 5) – Launch occurred on June 30, 2009.
 Sirius FM-6 (Radiosat 6, COSPAR 2013-058A) – Launch occurred on October 25, 2013.
 XM-3 (Rhythm, COSPAR 2005-008A) – Launch occurred on February 28, 2005.
 XM-4 (Blues, COSPAR 2006-049A) – Launch occurred on October 30, 2006.
 XM-5 (COSPAR 2010-053A) – Launch occurred on October 14, 2010.
 SXM-8 – Launch occurred on June 6, 2021, by a SpaceX Falcon 9 launch vehicle.

Defunct satellites 
 Sirius FM-1 (Radiosat 1) – Launch occurred on June 30, 2000.
 Sirius FM-2 (Radiosat 2) – Launch occurred on September 5, 2000.
 Sirius FM-3 (Radiosat 3) – Launch occurred on November 30, 2000.
 Sirius FM-4 (Radiosat 4) – Ground spare, was not launched into orbit. In October 2012, it was donated for display to the National Air and Space Museum's Steven F. Udvar-Hazy Center.
 XM-1 (Roll, COSPAR 2001-018A) – Launch occurred on May 8, 2001. Retired in 2016 (graveyard orbit).
 XM-2 (Rock, COSPAR 2001-012A) – Launch occurred on March 18, 2001. FCC license expired in 2014.
 SXM-7 – Launch occurred on December 13, 2020 by a SpaceX Falcon 9 launch vehicle, and was intended to replace satellite XM-3. On January 27, 2021, Sirius XM announced that the satellite suffered failures during in-orbit testing, but did not provide detail on the nature of those failures.

Milestones 
The following milestones have been set during and after the merger:

See also 

 Sirius Satellite Radio, former company
 XM Satellite Radio, former company
 1worldspace, former company
 List of Sirius XM Radio channels

References

External links 

 

 
2008 establishments in New York City
American companies established in 2008
American radio networks
Communications satellite operators
Mass media companies based in New York City
Mass media companies established in 2008
Liberty Media subsidiaries
Podcasting companies
Publicly traded companies based in New York City
Radio broadcasting companies of the United States
Satellite radio
Subscription services